Becq may refer to:

 Becque (river)
 Sonja Becq (born 1957), Belgian politician 
 Maria Strick (née Becq; 1577–after 1631), Dutch schoolmistress and calligrapher
 Louis Becq de Fouquières (1831–1887), French man of letters

See also
 Germanic toponymy
 Becque (disambiguation)
 Bec (disambiguation)
 Beek (disambiguation)